The South Africa women's national cricket team toured Bangladesh in September 2012. They played Bangladesh in 3 One Day Internationals and 3 Twenty20 Internationals, winning both series 2–1. The series preceded South Africa's participation in the 2012 ICC Women's World Twenty20, held in Sri Lanka.

Squads

WODI Series

1st ODI

2nd ODI

3rd ODI

WT20I Series

1st T20I

2nd T20I

3rd T20I

References

External links
South Africa Women tour of Bangladesh 2012 from Cricinfo

South Africa women's national cricket team tours
Women's international cricket tours of Bangladesh
International cricket competitions in 2012
2012 in women's cricket
2012 in Bangladeshi women's sport
2012 in Bangladeshi cricket